Agdistis salsolae is a moth of the family Pterophoridae. It is endemic to the  Canary Islands.

The wingspan is 16–18 mm. There are three generations per year, with adults on wing from March to April, from June to July and in October.

The larvae feed on Salsola oppositifolia.

External links

 Fauna Europaea

Agdistinae
Moths described in 1908